Michael Channing (born 30 June 1992), also known by the nickname of "Chan", is a former Wales international rugby league footballer who played as a  for the London Broncos in the Betfred Championship.

He previously played for the London Broncos in his first spell at the club, Castleford Tigers (Heritage № 940) in the First:Utility Super League and Featherstone Rovers in the Kingstone Press Championship.

Channing is a Wales international having represented Wales in 6 test matches. His most recent appearances came in the 2015 European Cup tournament after appearing 3 times beforehand in the 2012 Autumn International Series.

References

External links

(archived by web.archive.org) London Broncos profile
(archived by web.archive.org) Castleford Tigers profile
(archived by web.archive.org) Statistics at rlwc2017.com

1992 births
Living people
Castleford Tigers players
English people of Welsh descent
English rugby league players
Featherstone Rovers players
London Broncos players
Rugby league players from Surrey
Rugby league wingers
Sportspeople from Guildford
Wales national rugby league team players
York City Knights players